Iliza Vie Shlesinger (born ) is an American comedian, actress, television host, executive producer, and screenwriter. She was the 2008 winner of NBC's Last Comic Standing and went on to host the syndicated dating show Excused and the TBS game show Separation Anxiety.

In 2017, Shlesinger hosted her own late-night talk show called Truth & Iliza on Freeform. As of 2022, she has released six comedy specials on Netflix. Her sketch comedy show The Iliza Shlesinger Sketch Show premiered on Netflix in April 2020.

Early life
Iliza Vie Shlesinger was born in New York City to a Jewish family. She was raised in Dallas, Texas, where her family moved when she was a baby. She attended the private Greenhill School in Addison, Texas, where she studied Spanish and participated in the school's improvisation team.

Shlesinger performed with ComedySportz Dallas, and studied at the University of Kansas for her freshman year. She also participated in Semester at Sea. She transferred to Emerson College in Boston, Massachusetts, where she majored in film, refined her writing and editing skills, and became a member of one of the campus's comedy sketch groups, Jimmy's Traveling All Stars.

Career

After graduating from college, Shlesinger moved to Los Angeles to pursue stand-up comedy. She was one of the most popular members of the Whiteboy Comedy group of standup comedians in Los Angeles, which brought her to the stage at The Improv in Hollywood.

In 2007, Shlesinger won Myspace's So You Think You're Funny contest and has been featured as the G4 network's Myspace Girl of the Week. Her television credits include E! Network's Forbes Celebrity 100, TV Guide's America's Next Top Producer, Comedy Central Presents Season 14 Episode 18, John Oliver's New York Stand Up Show, Byron Allen's Comics Unleashed, and History Channel's History of a Joke. She has written for Heavy.com and had her own show on GOTV's mobile network.

In 2008, Shlesinger became the first woman, and the youngest, winner of NBC's Last Comic Standing, in the series' sixth season. She was twice selected by other comedians to compete in the head-to-head eliminations, winning each time. She appeared in The Last Comic Standing Tour.

Shlesinger worked with Lewis Black to contribute to Surviving the Holidays, a History Channel holiday special, and narrated the 2009 documentary Imagine It!² The Power of Imagination. In 2010, she released an on-demand comedy video, Man Up and Act Like a Lady, and an on-demand comedy album, iliza LIVE, on her website, via The ConneXtion. Around the time of these releases, Shlesinger appeared in a business comedy video series for Slate.

Shlesinger hosted The Weakly News on TheStream.tv from July 2007 to April 2012. She also hosted Excused, a syndicated American reality-based dating competition series, which ran from 2011 to 2013. She co-starred in the 2013 film Paradise. She began a podcast called Truth and Iliza in August 2014. Featuring celebrity guests and personal friends, the semi-weekly podcast is a forum for discussing matters which bother her and those on the show, with a punk theme song performed by Being Mean to Pixley.

Shlesinger was comic co-host of StarTalk Radio Show with Neil DeGrasse Tyson for season 7, episode 12 titled Cosmic Queries: Galactic Grab Bag on May 20, 2016.

On July 13, 2016, the ABCdigital original short-form digital comedy series Forever 31, which was created by, written by, executive produced by, and starring Shlesinger was released.

A late night show for Shlesinger was placed into development in September 2016 for the cable channel Freeform. Truth & Iliza began airing on May 2, 2017, and ran for six episodes.

On November 7, 2017, Weinstein Books published Shlesinger's book Girl Logic: The Genius and the Absurdity with an introduction by Mayim Bialik.

In December 2017, it was reported Shlesinger was sued by a man who was denied admission to one of her girls-only shows. The initial complaint was dismissed and then refiled as a class action suit.

Netflix
Shlesinger's first comedy album and video, War Paint, was recorded on December 1, 2012, at The Lakewood Theater in Dallas, Texas, and released on Netflix on September 1, 2013. Her second stand-up special, Freezing Hot, was recorded in Denver, Colorado, and premiered on Netflix on January 23, 2015. Her third Netflix stand-up special, titled Confirmed Kills, was recorded at The Vic Theatre in Chicago, Illinois, and premiered on Netflix on September 23, 2016. Her fourth Netflix stand-up special, Elder Millennial, was recorded aboard , at the USS Hornet Sea, Air & Space Museum in Alameda, California on February 23, 2018, and premiered on Netflix on July 24, 2018.
Her fifth Netflix stand-up special, Unveiled was recorded in Nashville and premiered on Netflix on Nov 19, 2019. 

Shlesinger also stars in the March 2020 Netflix film Spenser Confidential and The Iliza Shlesinger Sketch Show, which premiered April 1, 2020. Shlesinger intentionally hired a diverse team of writers so her sketches would appeal to a racially diverse audience, also intending her comedy was not "just for women."

Released on Netflix on January 7, 2021, following its world premiere on September 4, 2020, at the 77th Venice International Film Festival, Shlesinger played Anita Weiss in Pieces of a Woman, the sister to Martha, the main character. She starred, wrote, and executive produced the romantic comedy film Good on Paper, which premiered on Netflix on June 23, 2021.

Her sixth stand-up comedy special Iliza Shlesinger: Hot Forever premiered on Netflix in October 2022.

Personal life 
On May 12, 2018, Shlesinger married chef Noah Galuten in a Jewish ceremony in Los Angeles. They had a daughter in 2022.

Works

Comedy specials

Series

Film

References

External links

 
 
 
 Iliza Shlesinger at OkeyBlogging

1983 births
Living people
21st-century American actresses
21st-century American comedians
21st-century American Jews
21st-century American screenwriters
People from Dallas
Comedians from New York City
Comedians from Texas
Screenwriters from New York (state)
Screenwriters from Texas
Actresses from New York City
Actresses from Dallas
American television actresses
American film actresses
American sketch comedians
American stand-up comedians
American television writers
American women screenwriters
American women comedians
American women television writers
Jewish American actresses
Jewish American female comedians
Greenhill School alumni
Emerson College alumni
University of Kansas alumni
American feminists
Last Comic Standing winners
United Service Organizations entertainers